Aʀʏᴀɴ जाट
Dadanpur is a village in Jhajjar District, Haryana state, northern India.
Rajni Devi is the sarpanch of the village. The main caste is Jat and some other are Brahmin, Kumhar, Chude, and Chamar. The main gotra is Beniwal and some others are Gulia, Phogat, and Badesara. The main language is used in this village is Haryanvi. The nearest railway station is Machrauli.
 
INSTAGRAM - @aryan_beniwal_jaat

References

Villages in Jhajjar district